John William Nilen (30 January 1878 – 11 July 1963) was an Australian rules footballer who played with St Kilda in the Victorian Football League (VFL).

Family
The son of Patrick Nilen, and Elizabeth Nilen, née McElroy, John William Nilen was born on 30 January 1878.

Football
Cleared from Kalgoorlie to St Kilda on 18 May 1910, he played his only VFL First XVIII match for St Kilda, aged 32, against Collingwood, as a forward-pocket ruckman, at Victoria Park, on 21 May 1910 (round 3).

Notes

External links 

1878 births
1963 deaths
Australian rules footballers from Victoria (Australia)
St Kilda Football Club players